Ibrahim Morad (Arabic:إبراهيم مراد) (born 9 December 1988) is an Emirati footballer plays , who played in the Arabian Gulf League for Ittihad Kalba and Al Dhafra.

References

External links
 

Emirati footballers
1988 births
Living people
Al Dhafra FC players
Al-Ittihad Kalba SC players
Al Urooba Club players
Association football midfielders
UAE First Division League players
UAE Pro League players